Vizhiyil Vizhunthaval is a 2010 Tamil language romance film directed by Ajaz. The film stars newcomers Ajaz, Shilpa and Anaka, with Madhu, Anbu, Narayanan, Pavina, Amutha Ganeshan, and Gopi playing supporting roles. It was released on 23 July 2010.

Plot
Vinoth (Ajaz) is a young wealthy businessman and the owner of a company which had launched many innovative inventions. He falls in love at first sight with Mridula (Shilpa), who is from Australia, and appoints her as his new personal secretary. Vinoth tries to impress Mridula in many ways, but she is repulsed by his eccentric behavior and rejects his love proposal. A desperate Vinoth decides to make Mridula jealous, so he tries to seduce his new secretary Anitha (Anaka), who unexpectedly falls in love with him. Thereafter, Mridula is abducted by a psychopath. Vinoth and Anitha try to save her, They face many obstacles but successfully overcome them. They finally find Mridula in a deserted factory. Her abductor was waiting for Vinoth and tried to kill him. In the process, Anitha is shot dead by the psychopath, and Vinoth kills him in return. The psychopath was in fact paid by other company owners to kill Vinoth because they were jealous of his growth and success. Many years later, Vinoth and Mridula are a happily married couple and have two children.

Cast

Ajaz as Vinoth
Shilpa as Mridula
Anaka as Anitha
Madhu as Rajesh
Anbu as Suresh
Pavina as Anjali
Narayanan
Amutha Ganeshan
Gopi

Production
Ajaz, a software company owner, made his directorial debut with the romance film Vizhiyil Vizhunthaval under his own banner G-Ants Productions. Ajaz, who was also handling the story, screenplay, the dialogues and the editing, was playing the lead role in this film. Newcomers Shilpa and Anaka were selected to play the heroines. The film is based on the romance between the young generations of contemporary society. It pictures how the hero changes himself for his Love in terms of character, discipline and attitude have been clearly screen played. For one song, 56 costumes were changed in it revealed the choreographer Habib who had used special techniques for each song. Debutant music director Pollock has composed 7 songs and Biju Antony took care of camera work. The film director Ajaz said, "Being in the software industry and having been associated with a lot of back-end work for films, we have the right expertise, knowledge and infrastructure needed to produce hi-tech films. Vizhiyil Vizhunthavalwas quite graphic intensive (all the sets were created using graphics). We'll see how viewers accept Vizhiyil Vizhunthaval before deciding on our next production".

Soundtrack

The film score and the soundtrack were composed by Pollack. The soundtrack features 7 tracks. The audio was released on 12 October 2009 at the Sathyam cinemas in the presence of K. Bhagyaraj, Kalaipuli G. Sekaran, Youreka and Sivasakthi Pandian. A critic stated, "This composer has delivered a neat googly in this album. It pleases you with its seriousness and the sensible, unfussy use of background music. The songs, though westernized, have strong melodic touches that you really take to".

References

2010 films
2010s Tamil-language films
Indian romance films
2010 directorial debut films
2010 romance films